The Mixed free routine competition of the 2016 European Aquatics Championships was held on 11 May 2016.

Results
The final was held at 18:30.

References

Synchronised swimming